is a Japanese professional shogi player ranked 5-dan.

Early life and education
Kamimura was born in Nakano, Tokyo on December 10, 1986. He learned how to play shogi from his father and entered the Japan Shogi Association's apprentice school at the rank of 6-kyū under the guidance of professional shogi player Osamu Nakamura in September 1998.

Kamimura was promoted to the rank of apprentice professional 3-dan in October 2010, and obtained full professional status and the rank of 4-dan in October 2012 after winning the 51st 3-dan League (April 2012September 2012) with a record of 14 wins and 4 losses.

Kamimura is a graduate of Keio University, majoring in mathematical sciences. He is the first professional shogi player to graduate from the school.

Promotion history
The promotion history for Kamimura is as follows:
 6-kyū: September 1998
 3-dan: October 2010
 4-dan: October 1, 2012
 5-dan: October 10, 2019

References

External links
ShogiHub: Professional Player Info · Kamimura, Wataru
Blog: かみむらブログ 

Japanese shogi players
Living people
Professional shogi players
Keio University alumni
Professional shogi players from Tokyo
1986 births
People from Nakano, Tokyo